Meinrad Müller (born 7 November 1961) is a Swiss bobsledder. He competed in the two man event at the 1984 Winter Olympics.

References

External links
 

1961 births
Living people
Swiss male bobsledders
Olympic bobsledders of Switzerland
Bobsledders at the 1984 Winter Olympics
Sportspeople from Koblenz